Wu Jing, also known as Jacky Wu, (born 3 April 1974) is a Chinese actor, director and martial artist best known for his roles in various martial arts films such as Tai Chi Boxer, Fatal Contact, the Sha Po Lang films, and as Leng Feng in Wolf Warrior, its sequel Wolf Warrior 2, and most recently The Battle at Lake Changjin. Wu Jing is one of the most profitable actors in China and his movies are often the highest grossed films in China and around the world. Wu ranked first on the Forbes China Celebrity 100 list in 2019 and 23rd in 2020.

Career
In April 1995, Wu was spotted by martial arts choreographer Yuen Woo-ping, Wu played Hawkman / Jackie in 1996 film Tai Chi Boxer, his first Hong Kong film debut. Since then Wu has appeared in numerous mainland Chinese wuxia television series. He has also worked with choreographer and director Lau Kar-leung in 2003 film Drunken Monkey. Wu achieved success in Hong Kong action cinema for his role as a vicious assassin in 2005 film SPL: Sha Po Lang.

In 2006, Wu was continuing his move into Hong Kong cinema by starring in the film Fatal Contact. Wu is the male lead in 2007 film Twins Mission, starring the Twins duo. He also worked on the police action film Invisible Target which was released in July 2007.

In March 2008, Wu made his directorial debut, alongside action choreographer Nicky Li, on his film Legendary Assassin.
Wu played the Assassin in The Mummy: Tomb of the Dragon Emperor his American film debut.

Wu played Jing Neng in 2011 martial arts film Shaolin alongside Nicholas Tse, Andy Lau and Jackie Chan. Wu reprised a different role as Chan Chi-kit in the 2015 Hong Kong action film SPL II: A Time for Consequences.

Wu directed and starred in the action war film Wolf Warrior and its 2017 sequel Wolf Warrior 2. The latter film has become a hit at the Chinese summer box office and became the highest grossing film in China.

In 2019, Wu starred in hit film The Wandering Earth, based on a novella of the same name by Liu Cixin. When he discovered that the production team lacked funds to complete the film, he invested his own money to make up for the shortfall. The film ended up grossing  worldwide, including  in China. It became China's third highest-grossing film of all time, 2019's third highest-grossing film worldwide, the second highest-grossing non-English film to date, and one of the top 20 highest-grossing science fiction films to date.

Personal life
Wu Jing and Xie Nan's relationship began in 2012 and they got married in 2014. On 25 August 2014, Wu Jing's wife gave birth to a son Wu Suowei (吴所谓) (also named as Wu You (吴滺)). On 24 September 2018, they had a second son Wu Lü (吴律).

Filmography

Film

Television series

Accolades

References

External links

 Wu Jing Official Chinese Blog
 Wu Jing Official Website
 Wu Jing's Weibo
 
 
 An interview with Wu Jing by New Yorker

1974 births
20th-century Chinese male actors
21st-century Chinese male actors
Chinese film directors
Chinese male film actors
Chinese male television actors
Chinese martial artists
Chinese wushu practitioners
Living people
Male actors from Beijing
Sportspeople from Beijing